DreamHack Open Cluj-Napoca 2015 was the seventh Counter-Strike: Global Offensive Major Championship that was held from October 28–November 1, 2015 at the Sala Polivalentă in Cluj-Napoca, Romania. It was organized by DreamHack with help from Valve and the Professional Gamers League. The tournament had a total prize pool of US$250,000.

Eight teams were featured in the playoffs. Fnatic, G2 Esports, Luminosity Gaming, Natus Vincere, Ninjas in Pyjamas, Team EnVyUs, Team SoloMid, and Virtus.pro – all Legends from the last major – were once again Legends as no Challenger took their spots. Team EnVyUs, which defeated Fnatic and G2 Esports, was the winner of the event, defeating Natus Vincere, which defeated Luminosity Gaming and Ninjas in Pyjamas, in the finals, 2–0. This came after Team EnVyUs placed second at the previous major, including a game in which Fnatic came back from a large deficit in the first game of grand finals.

Format
The top eight teams from ESL One Cologne 2015 ("Legends") received direct invitations to Cluj-Napoca. This was the first Major to fill the other eight Major spots from a single Major qualifier, instead of directly from various regional qualifiers. For the Cluj-Napoca Major cycle, the regional qualifiers sent teams to DreamHack Open Stockholm 2015, where they faced off against the bottom eight teams from Cologne 2015. The top eight teams from DreamHack Open Stockholm 2015 then advanced to the Major as the "Challengers"

Teams were split up into four groups, and all group matches were best-of-ones with the exception of the final decider match. The highest seed would play the lowest seed in each group and the second and third seeds would play against each other. The winner of those two matches would play each other to determine which team moved on to the playoff stage, while the losers of the first round of matches also played. The loser of the lower match was then eliminated from the tournament. With one team advanced and one eliminated, the two remaining teams would play a best-of-three elimination match for the second playoff spot. This format is known as the GSL format, named for the Global StarCraft II League.

The playoffs bracket consisted of eight teams, two from each group. All of these matches were best-of-three, single elimination. Teams advanced in the bracket until a winner was decided.

Map Pool
The seven-map pool did not change from Cologne 2015. Before each best-of-one match in the group stage, teams alternated banning maps until five maps had been banned. One of the two remaining maps was randomly selected, and the team that that did not get a third ban then selected which side it wanted to start on. In all best-of-three series, each team first banned a map, leaving a five-map pool. Each team then chose a map, with the opposing team selecting which side they wanted to start on for their opponent's map choice. The two map picks were the first two maps in the best-of-three. If the series were to require a third map, the map was randomly selected from the three remaining maps.

Main Qualifier

Regional Qualifiers
Two teams from the first European qualifier moved on to the major. Eight teams that were eliminated in the said qualifier moved to the second European qualifier. Three teams from that qualifier moved on to the major. Two teams from the North American qualifier moved on to the major and one team from the Asian qualifier moved on to the major.

Europe Qualifiers

North American Qualifier

Asian Qualifier

Main Qualifier
The 16 teams at the major qualifier played at DreamHack Open Stockholm 2015. The bottom eight teams from ESL One Cologne 2015, five teams from two European qualifiers, two teams from the North American qualifier, and one team from the Asian qualifier.

Teams were divided into four groups and the top two from each group made it to the major.

DreamHack Open Stockholm 2015
The main qualifier took place at DreamHack Open Stockholm 2015.
Group A

Group B

Group C

Group D

Broadcast talent 
Hosts
 Paul "ReDeYe" Chaloner
 Richard Lewis

Interviewers
 Pala "Mantrousse" Gilroy Sen
 Scott "SirScoots" Smith

Analysts
 Robin "Fifflaren" Johansson
 Joona "natu" Leppänen
 Jason "moses" O'Toole
 Duncan "Thorin " Shields

Commentators
 James Bardolph
 Anders Blume
 Henry "HenryG" Greer
 Daniel "ddk" Kapadia
 Auguste "Semmler" Massonnat
 Matthew "Sadokist" Trivett

Broadcasts
All streams were broadcast on Twitch in various languages.

Teams

Pre-Major Ranking
The HLTV.org October 26, 2015 ranking of teams, displayed below, was the final ranking released before the Major.

†Change since October 19, 2015 ranking

Group stage

Group A

Group B

Group C

Group D

Playoffs

Quarterfinals

Team EnVyUs vs. Fnatic

Casters: Anders Blume & Semmler

Virtus.pro vs. G2 Esports

Casters: James Bardolph & ddk

Team SoloMid vs. Ninjas in Pyjamas

Casters: Anders Blume & moses

Luminosity Gaming vs. Natus Vincere

Casters: Sadokist & HenryG

Semifinals

Team EnVyUs vs. G2 Esports

Casters: James Bardolph & ddk

Ninjas in Pyjamas vs. Natus Vincere

Casters: Sadokist & HenryG

Finals

Casters: Anders Blume & Semmler

Team EnVyUs won its first title. kennyS and apEX had their first major title and NBK-, kioShiMa, and Happy won their second title, their first being with Team LDLC.com at DreamHack Winter 2014.

Final standings

Post-Major Ranking
The HLTV.org November 3, 2015 rankings of teams in the major is displayed below. The ranking was the first one released after the major.

†Change since October 26, 2015 ranking

References

External links
 Official webpage

2015 in Romanian sport
2015 in esports
Sport in Cluj-Napoca
Counter-Strike: Global Offensive Majors
DreamHack events